Eric Taylor may refer to:
 Eric Taylor (artist) (1909–1999), British artist
 Eric Taylor (gridiron football) (born 1981), American and Canadian football defensive tackle
 Eric Taylor (football manager) (1912–1974), English football manager
 Eric Taylor (musician) (1949-2020), American singer and songwriter
 Eric Taylor (screenwriter) (1897–1952), Hollywood screenwriter 
 Eric Openshaw Taylor (died 1987), British electrical engineer and scientific author
 Eric Taylor (Friday Night Lights), a character on Friday Night Lights